Peder Langenskiöld Folke (born 8 April 1987) is a Swedish curler and curling coach.

Teams

Record as a coach of national teams

References

External links
 

Living people
1987 births
Swedish male curlers
Swedish curling champions
Swedish curling coaches